Clacton Pier is a pier located in the seaside resort town of Clacton-on-Sea in England. It was named Pier of the Year in 2020 by the National Piers Society. The pier hosts rides, ten-pin bowling, arcades, a seqaurium, golf and a soft-play centre – as well as numerous food, drink and retail outlets.

Development

Clacton Pier, which opened on 27 July 1871 was officially the first building erected in the then-new resort of Clacton-on-Sea. By 1893, Clacton had become such a popular destination for day trippers that the pier was lengthened to 1180 ft (360m) and entertainment facilities, including a pavilion and a waiting room, were added to accommodate them.

Post-World War I to 1970s
At the end of the First World War, the pier was bought by Ernest Kingsman, and it remained in the ownership of his family until 1971.

Kingsman added some major improvements to the pier including: a RNLI lifeboat house; a theatre called the Ocean Theatre; the classically named Blue Lagoon Dance Hall; the Crystal Casino; an open-air stage; an open-air swimming pool; and a roller coaster which was called Steel Stella.

During World War II, the Pier was breached to prevent it being used as a landing stage. A floating German mine also caused considerable damage.

Following the war, after significant refurbishment, the 1946 season began with Gene Durham headlining the traditional seaside show The Ocean Review, supported by Betty Martin and Gordon Norville. Gene Durham continued to headline until 1950, when Tony Hancock took over. In later years, season-long headline acts included Ted Rogers and Roy Hudd.

By 1971, the pier was under the control of Barney Kingsman (Earnest Kingsman's Son) and with visitor numbers declining a decision was made to sell the Pier. It was sold privately during the year to Michael Goss. The Goss family already had the majority share in neighbouring Walton Pier. Goss ran the pier as a successful amusement centre until he eventually grew frustrated with the lack of support from the local authority and decided it was time to sell up and retire.

From 1971 to 1985, dolphins and killer whales were kept and displayed on the pier at the site of the former open-air swimming pool.

In 1973, a fire caused significant structural damage to the pier, particularly the roller coaster. In 1978, a severe storm caused additional significant structural weakness.

Restoration
August 1981 saw local businessmen Francis McGinty, John Treadwell, Denis McGinty and David Howe take ownership of the pier from Michael Goss with plans for a major redevelopment of the Pier including the possibility of a bar and disco, reintroduction of the dolphins to the dolphinarium and an upgrade of the pier ride offering. The proceeding years saw major additions to the pier at varying stages including the Whirlwind roller coaster, a Circus, Ice rink and a Roller Rink and even a water slide, unfortunately not all of the additions were a success and the pier company struggled financially on a couple of occasions until eventually in around 1993 the then operating company went into receivership which is where it remained for around about one year.

In 1994, a local businessman and his family, the Harrisons, bought the pier. They embarked on an ambitious and successful modernisation project to attract 20th century day trippers. The pier emerged as a modern amusement park, virtually unique in the sense that there are rides as you first enter, with the rest dotted throughout the length of the pier.

In March 2009 the pier was purchased by the Clacton Pier Company, who installed a new focal point, a 50 ft helter-skelter. Originally built in 1949 and used in a travelling show, it was featured in a 2008/2009 Marks & Spencer television advert. The helter-skelter collapsed during the St Jude storm on 28 October 2013.

Current Rides & Attractions

See also
List of piers in the United Kingdom

References

External links
The Whales & Dolphins of Clacton Pier (1971-1985)
Clacton Pier Official Website
Details on Clacton Pier

Pier
Grade II listed buildings in Essex
Piers in Essex
Coastal Essex